Chromosome 21 is one of the 23 pairs of chromosomes in humans. Chromosome 21 is both the smallest human autosome and chromosome, with 45 million base pairs (the building material of DNA) representing about 1.5 percent of the total DNA in cells. Most people have two copies of chromosome 21, while those with three copies of chromosome 21 have Down syndrome, also called "trisomy 21".

Researchers working on the Human Genome Project announced in May 2000 that they had determined the sequence of base pairs that make up this chromosome. Chromosome 21 was the second human chromosome to be fully sequenced, after chromosome 22.

Genes

Number of genes 
The following are some of the gene count estimates of human chromosome 21. Because researchers use different approaches to genome annotation their predictions of the number of genes on each chromosome varies (for technical details, see gene prediction). Among various projects, the collaborative consensus coding sequence project (CCDS) takes an extremely conservative strategy. So CCDS's gene number prediction represents a lower bound on the total number of human protein-coding genes.

Gene list 

The following is a partial list of genes on human chromosome 21. For complete list, see the link in the infobox on the right.

Diseases and disorders
The following diseases and disorders are some of those related to genes on chromosome 21:
 Alzheimer's disease
 Amyotrophic lateral sclerosis
 Atrial fibrillation, familial 
 Autoimmune polyendocrine syndrome
 Basal ganglia calcification
 Bethlem myopathy
 Closed angle glaucoma
 Cataract
 Down syndrome
 Erondu–Cymet syndrome
 Holocarboxylase synthetase deficiency
 Homocystinuria
 Hyperhomocysteinemia
 Hypotrichosis
 Immunodeficiency
 Inflammatory bowel disease
 Intellectual developmental disorder
 Jervell and Lange-Nielsen syndrome
 Keppen–Lubinsky syndrome
 Leukocyte adhesion deficiency-1
 Majewski osteodysplastic primordial dwarfism type II (MOPD II, or MOPD2)
 Non-small cell lung carcinoma
 Nonsyndromic deafness
 Peripheral neuropathy
 Primary ciliary dyskinesia
 Romano–Ward syndrome
 Ullrich congenital muscular dystrophy
 Unverricht–Lundborg disease, a form of progressive myoclonus epilepsy

Chromosomal conditions

The following conditions are caused by changes in the structure or number of copies of chromosome 21:
 Cancers: Rearrangements (translocations) of genetic material between chromosome 21 and other chromosomes have been associated with several types of cancer. For example, acute lymphoblastic leukemia (a type of blood cancer most often diagnosed in childhood) has been associated with a translocation between chromosomes 12 and 21. Another form of leukemia, acute myeloid leukemia, has been associated with a translocation between chromosomes 8 and 21.
 In a small percentage of cases, Down syndrome is caused by a rearrangement of chromosomal material between chromosome 21 and another chromosome. As a result, a person has the usual two copies of chromosome 21, plus extra material from chromosome 21 attached to another chromosome. These cases are called translocation Down syndrome. Researchers believe that extra copies of genes on chromosome 21 disrupt the course of normal development, causing the characteristic features of Down syndrome and the increased risk of medical problems associated with this disorder.
 Other changes in the number or structure of chromosome 21 can have a variety of effects, including intellectual disability, delayed development, and characteristic facial features. In some cases, the signs and symptoms are similar to those of Down syndrome. Changes to chromosome 21 include a missing segment of the chromosome in each cell (partial monosomy 21) and a circular structure called ring chromosome 21. A ring chromosome occurs when both ends of a broken chromosome are reunited.
 Duplication in Amyloid precursor protein (APP) locus (duplicated segment varies in length but includes APP) on Chromosome 21 was found to cause early onset familial Alzheimer's disease in a French family set (Rovelet-Lecrux et al.) and a Dutch family set. Compared to Alzheimer's caused by missense mutations in APP, the frequency of the Alzheimer's caused by APP duplications is significant. All patients that have an extra copy of APP gene due to the locus duplication show Alzheimer's with severe cerebral amyloid angiopathy.

Cytogenetic band

References

External links

 
 

Chromosomes (human)